Orléans Express is a coach operator in Quebec, Canada. Destinations served include Ottawa (ON), Gatineau, Montreal, Trois-Rivières, Quebec City, Rivière-du-Loup, Rimouski, and Gaspé.

Maritime Bus, a subsidiary of Coach Atlantic Group, provides service throughout Atlantic Canada connecting with Orléans Express at Rivière-du-Loup in Quebec.

Expedibus

Expedibus is a package shipping and courier company, operated cooperatively throughout Quebec by Orléans Express, Intercar, Autobus Maheux and Limocar.

References

External links
 Official Site: Orléans Express

Bus transport in Quebec
Intercity bus companies of Canada
Companies based in Montreal